Ko Kyung-min (born 11 April 1987) is a South Korean footballer who plays as a forward for Gyeongnam FC in the K League 2.

Career
He was selected by Incheon United in 2010 K-League Draft.

References

External links 

1987 births
Living people
Association football forwards
South Korean footballers
Incheon United FC players
Ulsan Hyundai Mipo Dockyard FC players
FC Anyang players
Ansan Mugunghwa FC players
Busan IPark players
Gyeongnam FC players
K League 1 players
Korea National League players
K League 2 players
South Korean Buddhists